The 2007 Swazi general strike has been ongoing since 25 July 2007, led by the Swaziland Federation of Trade Unions, the Swaziland Federation of Labour and the Swaziland National Association of Teachers. They plan to stage a two-hour full stoppage of public life every month until the incumbent absolute monarch Mswati III gives in to their demands: multi-party elections in October 2008, that benefits cease to be taxed and an end to absolute monarchy.

The first two-day stoppage occurred on 25 July in Manzini and on 26 July in Mbabane, when tens of thousands of workers demonstrated on the streets. The demonstrations constituted Swaziland's biggest civil movement for over a decade, since the last large-scale protests in 1996.

Government spokespersons denied the unions' and strikers' claims, stating that they should not demonstrate, but rather lobby the parliament, as only parliament has the power to change the constitution to allow multi-party elections.

On 2 August 2007, union representatives threatened further strikes if the government was not willing to listen, and also raised labour issues in addition to their political demands.

References

Swaziland
Strike
Strike
General strikes in Africa
Labour in Eswatini